Tom Slater may refer to:

 Tom Slater (politician) (born 1945), American politician from Iowa
 Tom Slater (baseball) (born 1968), American baseball coach
 Tom Slater (rugby union) (born 1986), Welsh rugby player
 Tom Slater (footballer) (born 1994), Australian footballer
 Thomas C. Slater (1945–2009), American politician from Rhode Island